Belohina inexpectata is a species of polyphagan beetles and the sole member of family Belohinidae. It is endemic to  southern Madagascar. Only a few specimens of this species are known.

References

Scarabaeoidea genera
Monotypic Scarabaeiformia genera